Frederico Tadewald (born 19 January 1908, date of death unknown) was a Brazilian rower. He competed in the men's eight event at the 1936 Summer Olympics.

References

External links
 

1908 births
Year of death missing
Brazilian male rowers
Olympic rowers of Brazil
Rowers at the 1936 Summer Olympics
Sportspeople from Rio Grande do Sul